Liber Research Community is a non-governmental organization in Hong Kong that focuses on researching land and development policies.

History 
The group was created in 2009 by postgraduates, including Chan Kim-ching, who studied geography and planning.

In 2017, it released a report of about 9,800 houses in the New Territories that were suspected to be involved in the illegal trading of ding rights. In 2020, it found 800 more village houses that were suspected to be illegally traded within the past 2 years.

In 2018, it published a research report stating that the government had underestimated the amount of brownfield sites in the New Territories, with the government estimating 1,300 hectares, and Liber Research Community finding 1,521 hectares. Additionally in 2018, it found that around 300 hectares of government land was underutilized.

In 2019, it released research where HK $9.4 billion of stamp duty was exempted in the past 10 years, when property buyers used companies to buy and sell properties via shares transfers.

In 2021, it determined that nano flats, defined as units below 260 square feet, accounted for 13% of all new units in 2019, and were the result of government policies, including the reduction the amount of windows required in an apartment. SCMP later released an opinion piece based on the research, stating that construction of nano flats should be curbed.

In May 2021, it released a report titled Research Report on Development Potential of Vacant Small House Land, which determined that of a total of 3,380 hectares of village-type land, 1,548.8 hectares were idle and privately owned, with a separate 932.9 hectares of idle land belonging to the government. It determined that of the 1,548.8 hectares of privately owned idle land, 149.1 hectares appeared to be scheduled for illegal development of small houses, where collusion between developers and villagers was likely.

In June 2021, it released Missing Brownfields- Hong Kong Brownfields Report 2021, a collaborative report with Greenpeace East Asia where together, they found a total of 1,950 hectares of brownfield sites, 379 more hectares than the government was previously able to locate.

Research topics 
According to its website, it lists 5 primary research areas:

 Hong Kong Land Research
 Housing Policy Research
 Open Government Research
 Food Safety Research
 Hong Kong-China Relation Research

Articles

Public-Private Partnerships 
In 2018, it published an article which described various issues with land development from Public-Private Partnership (PPPs), a method promoted by the government's Task Force on Land Supply to develop land on 1,000 hectares of agricultural land, owned by four major developers. The government has claimed that there were successful precedents with PPP, including at Sha Tin and Tin Shui Wai. However, the article pointed out that the PPP development of Sha Tin's Area 14 (City One) was different than the PPP model promoted by the government, and that Area 14 was only a small portion of the overall Sha Tin project. Additionally, the article mentioned that the PPP model for Area 14 was used due to the government having financial difficulties, and that the current government has no such financial difficulties, negating the need for further PPP developments.

Tin Shui Wai also had issues with its PPP development, including a private memorandum of understanding between the developer and the government, which stipulated that commercial projects in government facilities cannot threaten the developer's commercial facilities, restricting competition and increasing prices for residents. Carrie Lam stated that "another Tin Shui Wai" should not be allowed to happen again.

Lands Resumption Ordinance 
Liber Research Community published an article in 2018 where it described the government's approach to land resumption. The government has stated that the Public-Private Partnership model is preferred to develop agricultural land, rather than invoking the Lands Resumption Ordinance (LRO). However, the government has used the LRO to resume older properties to develop luxury housing, but has stated that using LRO to resume agricultural land is "disrespectful to private property rights" and creates "uncertainty" when it comes to property rights. This has caused developers to hoard even more agricultural land, in hopes that the PPP model will help them subsidize future development of the land.

Small House Policy 
In 2018 and 2019, it published articles on the history of the small house policy, after reviewing declassified documents from the government. It found that the policy was meant to be temporary, to help villagers establish more permanent houses; only 7% of all rural buildings in the New Territories at the time were permanent, with the rest being crude structures. In 1956, the Heung Yee Kuk petitioned the government, stating that if villagers had to pay land premium to build houses, it would be equal to "forcibly taking away people's properties." The government conducted research and responded, stating that the government's position of paying land premium not being inappropriate, and not infringing on any rights. One argument presented by the government was that the government constructed roads and other facilities, and thus recovering some of the cost was appropriate; the Qing dynasty did not provide such facilities. Additionally, the article mentioned that Cecil Clementi may have been misquoted, as he said villagers could build houses freely, but only if they reported and obtained pre-approval from him; the latter condition of pre-approval often being left out when Clementi was quoted.

The Kuk began a "public relations war," and when describing small house rights, replaced "reasonable rights" of villagers with "traditional rights" in Article 40 of the Basic Law. It also began to label the small house policy, created in 1972, as a "custom" that originated from the Qing dynasty. Thus, the policy was meant to be temporary, but in the 1980s, was morphed by the Heung Yee Kuk to have been a perpetual right.

Land allocation 
In 2017, it released an article that studied effective land allocation. The government's Development Bureau created the 2017-18 Land Sale Programme, which reserved 28 sites for residential development, providing about 18,810 units. The government claimed that there were already too many public housing units at some of the sites, and therefore said that the developments should be for private units, causing a further exacerbation of unavailable public housing. The article also noted that some sites were unzoned, and without rezoning, housing could not be built- meaning those sites reflected a false supply of housing. Furthermore, CY Leung changed procedures such that important decisions on housing development could be adjusted by the financial secretary and other officials behind confidential and closed meetings, bypassing established rules, and creating potential loopholes in planning.

MTR and property analysis 
In July 2021, it published 7 separate articles analyzing property development and the MTR.

1. MTR revenue model 
In the first article, Liber detailed the history of MTR's revenue model. It discovered that the "Rail + Property" development model was originally formed to offset unexpected financial difficulties with creating the original MTR lines, with original estimates that MTR's property would account for approximately 20% of its total revenue.

The Executive Council also determined that since MTR had to apply for land grants from the government, it was the government's decision on how land above MTR stations should be allocated, stating "the grant of comprehensive development rights on land affected by railway installations will be discretionary". Land above stations would not necessarily be used to build private housing to maximize MTR's revenue, but could be used to solve issues of housing in Hong Kong, such as by developing public housing instead. The Executive Council also noted that "revenue from property development was not originally envisaged as being used as a means of financing the capital cost of the railway itself" and that revenue from property development was to be used for a "contingency reserve", such as for offsetting excessive construction costs.

The report noted that 40% of MTR's revenue is currently from property, and that the original intent of using property revenue for contingency purposes had shifted into a different, unsustainable model where property is used to subsidize operations and construction of new stations.

2. Land hoarding along MTR lines 
In the second article, Liber found that property developers have bought and hoarded land along newly announced MTR lines. It found that large developers had already hoarded at least 80 hectares of land along the Northern Link MTR line. After doing so, developers started to lobby for the government to relax Comprehensive Development Areas (CDA) planning rules, rules meant to build new areas in an organized and fully utilized fashion. If CDA planning rules are to be relaxed along the new MTR lines, developers will be able to profit from their hoarding of land, while the general public will bear the cost of having underutilized land.

3. MTR as a property manager 
Liber also found that MTR has shifted from developing properties to a strategy of renting out and managing properties. It found that MTR manages 112,759 flats, housing around 300,000 people. Analyzing Deeds of Mutual Covenant (DMCs), it found that DMCs were often assigned MTR as its manager, even if the property was built by other developers. Additionally, MTR also outsources management of some properties to other developers, sharing management fees and business with them. As MTR develops more stations and controls management of above-station property, Liber forecasts that MTR's property management business will keep growing larger.

It also found that some owners of MTR-managed apartments have been unhappy with MTR as the manager of their properties, but MTR employs multiple strategies to make it difficult for apartment owners to form an owner's corporation and switch management companies. With no competition, it found that MTR had raised management fees by as much as 19% in one year for apartment owners, poorly maintained common areas of apartments, and hid management budgets from homeowners.

7. MTR and overseas projects 
In Liber's 7th article, it found that MTR has been expanding overseas, using profits from its Hong Kong operations to subsidize overseas operations in lower-margin markets, such as in Australia, the United Kingdom, and Sweden.

Publications

See also 

 Housing in Hong Kong
 Small House Policy

References

External links 

 Website
 Facebook
 Instagram
 YouTube
 MeWe
 Twitter
 Spotify

Think tanks based in Hong Kong
Foundations based in Hong Kong